Colunga may refer to:

In people:
 Alejandro Colunga, a Mexican painter and sculptor
 Fernando Colunga, a Mexican actor
 Adrián Colunga, a Spanish footballer 

In places:
 Colunga, a municipality in Asturias, Spain
 Colunga (parish), in Asturias, Spain